Mame Diarra Bousso (1833–1866) is a Sufi saint from Senegal. The annual pilgrimage to the site of her death and mausoleum is the only Muslim pilgrimage dedicated to a woman in Senegal. She was the mother of Ahmadou Bamba]].

Biography
Bousso was born to Serigne Mouhamadou Bousso and Sokhna Asta Wâlo Mbackein 1833 in Mbusôbé, a town in northeast Senegal today attached to Podor.

She died at age 33 in 1866 and was buried in Porokhane.

Legacy and sainthood

Today, thousands take the annual pilgrimage to the site of her death and mausoleum in Porokhane, Senegal, the only Muslim pilgrimage dedicated to a woman in Senegal. The site also includes a mosque as well as a vocational complex for girl to receive education and training.

Bousso is also celebrated in the African diaspora among some immigrant communities. In Harlem, men and women gather to recount what they believe were her miracles, and her son Amadou Bamba, recites her poetry, and listen to musicians singing about her life.

Further reading
 « Hommage à Sokhna Diarra Bousso (1833-1866) : Un modèle de vertus à méditer et à suivre » (biographie sur Seneweb, 2 mai 2009)
S. Thiam, Dama Diarra Bousso: Un idéal de vie. Mémoire de maîtrise. Dakar, Senegal: UCAD (Université Cheikh Anta Diop), 1998

References

1833 births
1866 deaths
Senegalese women
Senegalese Muslims
Senegalese Sufi saints